This is a list of all five Jiminy Cricket educational serials that originally aired on The Mickey Mouse Club TV series. The serials feature Jiminy Cricket, Pinocchio's conscience, providing general education and science information in an entertaining and accessible manner. The serials also have a strong focus on the importance of books and learning on one's own. The I'm No Fool and You series were later updated in the 1980s and 1990s as stand-alone shorts, and were shown in schools and occasionally on the Disney Channel.

I'm No Fool series
Each short is less than 10 minutes in runtime and begins and ends with the theme song, "I'm No Fool", with the lyrics to the closing number reworked to include the lessons taught during the short. Jiminy presents each hypothetical situation by drawing chalk outlines of the primary participants (usually a stereotypical, Family Circus-esque American boy) on a black board. The drawings then come to life and get into various questionable situations, with Jiminy steering them in the right direction.

Filmography
I'm No Fool with a Bicycle (10/06/55)*
I'm No Fool with Fire (12/01/55)*
I’m No Fool as a Pedestrian (10/?/56)*
I'm No Fool in Water (11/15/56)*
I'm No Fool Having Fun (12/15/56)
I'm No Fool with Electricity (10/26/1973)*

(*) = Updated in the mid to late 1980s with additional live-action footage

You and Your series
Similarly to the I'm No Fool series above, Jiminy Cricket teaches children about the human body.

Filmography
You - the Human Animal (10/20/55)
You - and Your Five Senses (12/15/55)*
You - and Your Eyes (11/07/56)*
You - and Your Food (4/18/57)
You - the Living Machine (5/01/57)
You - and Your Ears (10/03/57)
You - and Your Sense of Touch (1964)*
You - and Your Senses of Smell and Taste (4/01/77)
(*) = Updated in the mid through late 1980s with additional live-action footage

Nature of Things series
Jiminy Cricket teaches children about the animals of nature, in a similar manner to the I'm No Fool series. This series also had live-action footage lifted from True-Life Adventures, this series was also known as Animal Autobiography, generally these had only intro sequence featuring Jiminy Cricket, the rest was live-action of real Animals.

Filmography
Animal Champions (10/13/55)
Cansdale (10/27/55)	
The Camel (1/26/56)
The Horse (10/23/1956)
The Elephant (11/01/56)

Encyclopedia series
Jiminy Cricket teaches children how to spell, also in a similar manner to the I'm No Fool series. The series had a catchy theme song from which many children learned to spell "encyclopedia", most likely inspired by Paul Whiteman's novelty hit, "C-O-N-S-T-A-N-T-I-N-O-P-L-E" (both songs even had the same tempo and meter).

Filmography
Cork and Wheelwright (11/01/56)
Milk (11/26/56)
Tuna (12/27/56)
Railroads (2/19/57)
Steel (4/26/57)
Curiosity (1956)

The following Mickey Mouse Club Newsreel Specials were aired under the Encyclopedia banner but didn't feature Jiminy Cricket.
Uranium Hunt (10/30/57)
Cormorant Fishing (12/27/57)
Roaring Midgets (1/20/58)
Shipyards (1/20/58)
The Lobster Story (1/20/58)
Shooting the Rapids (1/20/58)

Educational film 
In 1984, Disney Educational Inc. produced a film called Jiminy Cricket, P.S. (Problem Solver) which recycles animation from other Disney shorts. The film was 10 minutes long, and also stars Goofy, Donald Duck, and Ludwig Von Drake. It was originally released on VHS

Notes

External links 
 Animated shorts: I'm No Fool
 The Encyclopedia of Disney Animated Shorts: You and Your
 Everything 2
 From Ukelele Ike to Jiminy Cricket: Cliff Edwards

Mickey Mouse television series
The Mickey Mouse Club serials
1955 American television series debuts
1959 American television series endings
American Broadcasting Company original programming
1950s American animated television series